Qarah Quyun-e Jonubi Rural District is in Qarah Quyun District of Showt County, West Azerbaijan province, Iran. At the National Census of 2006, its population (as a part of the former Showt District of Maku County) was 13,931 in 3,162 households. There were 4,360 inhabitants in 1,253 households at the following census of 2011, by which time the district had been separated from the county, Showt County established, and divided into two districts: the Central District and Qarah Quyun Districts. At the most recent census of 2016, the population of the rural district was 4,421 in 1,345 households. The largest of its 12 villages was Tazeh Kand, with 2,087 people.

References 

Showt County

Rural Districts of West Azerbaijan Province

Populated places in West Azerbaijan Province

Populated places in Showt County